Gonario or Gonnario II (born c. 1090) was the Judge of Arborea circa 1116.  He is known to have been a scion of the House of Serra and married Elena, the heiress of Comita I of the Lacon-Zori. He left behind a daughter, Elena, and a son, Constantine I.

Sources
Fara, G. F. De Rebus Sardois.
Manno, Giuseppe (1835). Storia di Sardegna. P.M. Visaj.

Judges (judikes) of Arborea
1090s births
12th-century deaths